Max Terpis, real name Max Pfister, also Max Pfister-Terpis, (1 March 1889 in Zürich – 18 March 1958 in Zollikon) was a Swiss dancer, choreographer, director and psychologist.

Publications 
 Tanz und Tänzer (1946)

Filmography 
 Marriage

Bibliography 
 Robert Heiß, Hildegard Hiltmann (editor): Der Farbpyramiden-Test nach Max Pfister. Huber, Bern 1951.
 Wolfgang Martin Schede: Farbenspiel des Lebens. Max Pfister Terpis. Architekt Tänzer Psychologe 1889–1958. Atlantis, Zürich 1960.
 Elisa Frasson: Max Terpis, Tanz und Tänzer. Dissertation. Universität Venedig 2005, .
 Bernd-Ulrich Hergemöller, Klaus Sator: Terpis, Max. In: Bernd-Ulrich Hergemöller (editor): Mann für Mann. Biographisches Lexikon zur Geschichte von Freundesliebe und mannmännlicher Sexualität im deutschen Sprachraum. Part 2: Rat–Z. Lit, Münster 2010, . (Google books).

References

External links 
 
 
 
 

1889 births
1958 deaths
Entertainers from Zürich
Swiss choreographers
Swiss male ballet dancers
Swiss theatre directors